Danny Greene (born December 26, 1961) is a former professional American football wide receiver for one season with the Seattle Seahawks in the National Football League.  He played college football at the University of Washington where he was a team captain.

See also

References 

1961 births
Living people
Players of American football from Compton, California
American football wide receivers
Washington Huskies football players
Seattle Seahawks players